In botany and plant taxonomy, a series is a subdivision of a genus, a taxonomic rank below that of section (and subsection) but above that of species.

Sections and/or series are typically used to help organize very large genera, which may have hundreds of species.

Cultivar marketing
The term "series" is also used (in seed marketing) for groupings of cultivars, but this term has no formal status with that meaning in the ICNCP.

References

 
Botanical nomenclature
Plant taxonomy